The Serpent Society is an organization of snake-themed supervillains appearing in American comic books published by Marvel Comics. The society is a continuation of the original group the Serpent Squad and was later changed into Serpent Solutions. The Serpent Society first appeared in Captain America #310 (October 1985) and was created by writer Mark Gruenwald and artist Paul Neary. Serpent Solutions first appeared in Captain America: Sam Wilson #1 by writer Nick Spencer and artist Daniel Acuña.

The Serpent Society was formed by Sidewinder as he gathered a number of villains with snake-themed powers. The group was organized more like a supervillain labor union, with the members providing protection for each other, sharing profits, etc. The Society took jobs for criminal organizations such as HYDRA, the Maggia, the Kingpin, and A.I.M. Some of these jobs brought the Serpent Society into conflict with Captain America and his partners. At one point, the Viper took control of the Society, plotting to take control of the United States, but was ultimately foiled by Captain America, D-Man, Nomad, the Falcon and former members of the Serpent Society. The Society would briefly reform over the years, but never made much impact.
 
As part of the All-New Marvel NOW! branding, a resurrected Viper (Jordan Stryke) took control of the Serpent Society. He reorganized it as "Serpent Solutions" and provided their services to various corporations. Serpent Solutions were opposed by the new Captain America, formerly the Falcon.
 
The Serpent Society has appeared in Marvel's The Avengers: Earth's Mightiest Heroes cartoon series as well as the Toei anime series Marvel Disk Wars: The Avengers. The Serpent Society was also part of the Captain America: The Winter Soldier video game.

Concept and creation
The Serpent Society first appeared in Captain America #310 (Oct. 1985) and was created by Mark Gruenwald and Paul Neary. Serpent Solutions first appeared in Captain America: Sam Wilson #1 by writer Nick Spencer and artist Daniel Acuña.

Most of the villains Mark Gruenwald introduced in Captain America were created to symbolize aspects of contemporary American culture and the world political situation. In the case of the Serpent Society, Gruenwald created them to symbolize trade unions.

Fictional team history

Formation
The Serpent Society was founded by Sidewinder, and was a descendant of sorts from the two original Serpent Squads. The first Squad consisted of the original Viper, his brother the original Eel, and the Cobra. The second Squad consisted of the second Viper (who was also formerly Madame Hydra), the Eel, Princess Python, the Cobra, and the Atlantean warlord Krang. Sidewinder led the third incarnation of the Squad that included Anaconda, Black Mamba and Death Adder. They were to retrieve the fabled Serpent Crown from its then-underwater grave. Sidewinder used his cloak and abandoned his comrades during an underwater mishap, and proceeded to collect the reward for the Crown.

Anaconda, Mamba and Adder survived and confronted Sidewinder. During that time, Sidewinder had invested the money and started the groundwork for the Serpent Society. The Society was to provide its members with better access to technology, bigger access to jobs, higher pay, comradeship, safe lodging, and a host of other benefits. Most importantly, with Sidewinder's teleportation cloak, members never had to fear imprisonment again. It was, essentially, a supervillain labor union.

After persuading his former comrades of his true intention to better their lot (and paying their share of the reward plus interest), he had them contact other snake-themed criminals which included the Asp, Diamondback, the Constrictor, the Cobra, Princess Python, the Viper, the Rattler, Cottonmouth, and Bushmaster. The Viper refused to attend the first initial gathering. Constrictor, unimpressed with the proceedings, walked out and tried to turn the group over to the Avengers.

Sidewinder, Anaconda, Black Mamba, Death Adder, Asp, Diamondback, Cottonmouth, the Cobra, Bushmaster, Rattler, and Princess Python became charter members of the Serpent Society. They headquartered at Serpent Citadel, which was an abandoned mental hospital located in upstate New York. Sidewinder sent them out to contact various criminal organizations including HYDRA, the Maggia, the Kingpin, and A.I.M. From A.I.M. they received their first paying assignment: the elimination of their former leader MODOK. The Society's success in killing MODOK quickly cemented their reputation as criminal talents of the first caliber. Captain America intervened many times during their early years, but was never able to put them out of commission.

Two charter members soon left the Society. Princess Python fled during the MODOK assignment and was soon after expelled from their ranks. Death Adder was killed by Scourge of the Underworld when he was sent to ransom the Princess to her Circus of Crime cohorts.

Later, the Viper sent a fourth Serpent Squad (though not named as such) consisting of Copperhead, Black Racer, Fer-de-Lance and Puff Adder to infiltrate the Society with the intention of assassinating Sidewinder and setting herself up as the rightful leader. When the four were taken to Serpent Citadel by Sidewinder, it was easy for the rest of the Viper's allies (Coachwhip, Boomslang, Slither, and Rock Python), to assault the place. Many of the charter members went turncoat and supported the Viper, whereas the Asp, Black Mamba, Bushmaster, and Diamondback remained loyal to Sidewinder.

The Viper used the Society and its resources to poison the water supply of Washington DC, which turned its citizens into snake-men. The ensuing chaos nearly destroyed the capital. Diamondback managed to escape with Sidewinder and solicited help from Captain America (who then was known as "The Captain" while another man donned the Captain America costume and identity) and his allies Demolition Man, Nomad, the Falcon, and Vagabond. The team stormed Serpent Citadel, rescued the Society members that were loyal to Sidewinder, and captured many others. The Viper, however managed to escape.

In the end, Cobra subdued the Viper and turned her over to the Captain on the condition that he allowed the Serpent Society 24 hours to evacuate from their headquarters. When the Captain refused the deal the Cobra turned Viper over anyway.

Bitter over the betrayal, Sidewinder left the Society and the Cobra became its new leader, eventually calling himself King Cobra. With the exception of Slither and the Viper herself, all of the Viper's agents remained with the Society. The Society re-located to a new secret headquarters in the Bronx.

The trial
Shortly afterwards, Diamondback became romantically involved with Captain America and tried to leave the Society altogether to be with him. Despite the fact that she was a member of a criminal organization that he desperately wanted to put out of commission, Captain America did not force her to betray her companions. The Society, however, had Diamondback under surveillance and when they realized she had been seeing Captain America socially, certain members demanded that she should be put on trial for treason.

Diamondback was found guilty. Every member voted for her death except for Asp, Black Mamba, Bushmaster and Rock Python. Penalty was death by injection, but King Cobra said he would commute the sentence if she would cooperate with them by revealing the true identity of Captain America. Diamondback refused but Black Mamba secretly alerted Sidewinder, who teleported in to save Diamondback at the last moment.

Diamondback, seeking revenge against the Society, sought out Paladin when Captain America could not guarantee that Black Mamba and Asp be given immunity from arrest. The two infiltrated the Society's headquarters, only to be captured along with Mamba and Asp. Captain America, on the other hand, from his sky cycle, spotted a Serpent Saucer piloted by Cottonmouth and Fer-de-Lance, which was heading back to the Society's hideout. Cap entered the hideout along with the saucer and quickly subdued the two Serpents. He quickly freed Diamondback, Paladin, Mamba and Asp and together they brought down the Society. All members were taken to prison with the exception of Diamondback, Asp, and Mamba (Asp and Mamba eventually were given immunity from arrest due to their help in defeating their former colleagues). Anaconda, Puff Adder and Rock Python escaped capture, as they were not at the headquarters at the time. Boomslang was in the hospital after being shot by thugs around this period. Puff Adder and Rock Python were eventually imprisoned after being thrown out of their Serpent Saucer by MODAM. Anaconda, Black Mamba, Asp, and Diamondback were all invited by MODAM to join the Femizons. Afterwards, Mamba, Asp, and Diamondback formed a new team called BAD Girls, Inc. with fellow Femizon Impala.

After spending time in prison, the Society re-formed again, going back to their old ways. Another encounter with Captain America and the now defunct team called Force Works seemed to have permanently put them out of commission; both Puff Adder and Black Mamba later said that the Society had disbanded.

Disassembled
However, the Society re-formed yet again in the Captain America/Avengers Disassembled tie-ins. King Cobra, Rattler, Bushmaster, and a new Death Adder had aided the Thunderbolts during the Civil War storyline. After that, the four villains have been identified as members of the 142 registered superheroes who appear on the cover of the comic book Avengers: The Initiative #1. Anaconda served with the Six Pack and was later defeated by the New Warriors; Diamondback, Black Mamba, and Asp had reformed BAD Girls, Inc.; Cottonmouth had not been seen since he broke free from prison with Hawkeye, but was later taken back into custody by S.H.I.E.L.D.

2008 – present
During the 2008 "Secret Invasion" storyline, in which a race of alien shapeshifters known as the Skrulls were discovered to have engaged in a subversive, long-term invasion of Earth, the Serpent Society took a number of civilians hostage in a compound in the American Midwest, claiming they were protecting themselves from the Skrulls. Nova and his Nova Corps deputies defeated them in seconds.

The Serpent Society appeared in the 2012 "Avengers vs. X-Men" storyline, during which they were confronted by the X-Men. They were next seen battling Taskmaster and Deadpool after they were contracted by Leviathan to capture Marcus Johnson.

Subsequently, Sidewinder returned to lead the Serpent Society, which during one endeavor, attacked the superhero group being protected by Elektra. Having studied the Serpent Society and its members while working for S.H.I.E.L.D., Elektra was able to defeat the Society.

As part of Marvel Comics' 2015 All-New, All-Different Marvel initiative, Jordan Stryke, also known as the Viper, returned from the dead and became leader of the Serpent Society. He rebranded the group as a criminal business called Serpent Solutions, which later came into conflict with Sam Wilson, who had assumed the identity of Captain America, and his allies, which included the now-retired Diamondback. After their plans were foiled, the Serpent Society were arrested by the authorities.

Most of the members of Serpent Solutions escaped from prison and reunited during the 2017 "Secret Empire" storyline, including Slither, who rejoined the group.

The Serpent Society was next seen working with the brand new Constrictor, the original's son. He had stolen the Book of the Iron Fist and planned to sell it to Iron Fist's enemy Choshin. This led to a battle between the serpents, Choshin's samurais, and Iron Fist and Sabretooth. Iron Fist and Coachwhip were the last two fighters standing, and Coachwhip revealed that the Society did not know it was not the real Constrictor and that he had not told them where he hid the book.

During the Thing's bachelor party, Johnny Storm unwittingly hired the Serpent Society as strippers. Anaconda, Asp, Black Mamba, Black Racer, Fer-de-Lance, and Princess Python jumped out of the Thing's cake and battled the Thing and his superhuman guests, including Captain America, Iron Man, Thor, Black Panther, Doctor Strange, Luke Cage, Spider-Man, Rocket Raccoon, and Thundra, among others. The ladies of the Serpent Society were eventually defeated and taken into custody.

In a prelude to the "Hunted" storyline, most, if not all, members of the Serpent Society were captured by Kraven the Hunter, Taskmaster, and Black Ant and forced to participate in a murderous hunt set up by Arcade. While Piet Voorhees' Cobra alias (where he was called King Cobra by Arcade) was selected to be a member of the Savage Six, the rest of the Society members were placed in electric cages to wait for the hunt to commence. After the hunt began, the Society attempted to battle the robotic drones being controlled by the wealthy participants, though they realized they were outmatched and fled with the rest of the supervillains. As they fled, Cottonmouth and Black Mamba commented that they did not believe Viper was suited to be the Serpent Society's leader. They are saved by Vulture, who took over as leader of the band of villains. The Society then joined in the fight against the hunters. After Kraven the Hunter had Arcade lower the force field, they are seen with Armadillo charging towards the awaiting police officers only to be subdued by the Avengers and the Fantastic Four.

The male members of the Serpent Society attended the Criminal Technology Show Expo, where M.O.D.O.K. had disguised himself as Arnim Zola. M.O.D.O.K. followed the men into the restroom where he beat them to near death as revenge for his murder many years prior. Iron Man, who had been working with M.O.D.O.K. and disguised as a HYDRA agent, suggested they hide the supervillains before they regained consciousness. However, King Cobra learned of this and alerted the rest of the supervillains in attendance to M.O.D.O.K.'s and Iron Man's scheme, causing a fight to break out.

During the "Devil's Reign" storyline, Coachwhip and Puff Adder appear as members of Mayor Wilson Fisk's incarnation of the Thunderbolts at the time when Mayor Fisk had outlawed superhero activity. They alongside the Thunderbolts unit with them attack Spider-Woman only to be fought off by Spider-Woman as she gets Lindsay McRabe to safety. Boomslang was seen as an inmate of the Myrmidon and was defeated by Moon Knight in one of the prison bouts.

The Serpent Society started killing and throwing bodies into an offering pile at their old Serpent Solutions lair in the "name of the serpent". Their worshiping is crashed by Nighthawk. The Avengers also arrive and find that Nighthawk defeated them. The portal that the Serpent Society opened with their worshiping summoned the serpent in question who turns out to be Mephisto' dog form as it was mentioned by Nighthawk that the serpent was one of his forms. The Serpent Society later escaped from police custody and started killing people while making their way across the Brooklyn Bridge causing the Avengers to take action.

Membership
The membership of the Serpent Society has included:

Founding members

Viper's agents

Later members

Other versions

Exiles
Another alternate version of the Serpent Society appeared in Exiles #89. The Exiles team had to restore Earth #27537. The Exiles had a hard time defeating the Society, which consisted of Cobra, Anaconda, Bushmaster, Death Adder, Cottonmouth, Diamondback, Rattler, Sidewinder, and an unnamed woman, but eventually the Exiles did manage to win and moved over to another reality. What the Serpent Society was doing on this Earth exactly was never revealed, though it was revealed they had previously killed the Spider-Man of their reality.

Marvel Adventures
The Marvel Adventures features the Sons of the Serpents as the Serpent Society. However, the actual group eventually appeared, consisting of Sidewinder, Cobra, Anaconda, and Cottonmouth, and battled Spider-Man. They plotted to turn the civilians of the city into snake-like creatures by poisoning the water supply. However, Spider-Man's interference led to the Lizard drinking the poison himself, becoming a giant reptilian creature. The Serpent Society, satisfied with their success, teleported away, leaving Spider-Man to battle the Lizard.

Ultimate Marvel
In the Ultimate Marvel universe, the Serpent Society is instead a gang known as the Serpent Skulls. Led by Crossbones, the group consisted of second-in-command Diamondback and lieutenants Black Racer, Sidewinder, Death Adder, King Cobra, Bushmaster, and Anaconda. Each member had his or her own underlings thematic to that character: Sidewinder had several men dressed as chauffeurs, Black Racer had a group of ninjas, Death Adder led a group of punks, and Anaconda was the leader of a female biker gang. The Serpent Skulls took over a Roxxon facility and began distributing super-powered drugs in Hell's Kitchen. Bushmaster was murdered by the Scourge of the Underworld, a masked vigilante who had targeted gang members. The Serpent Skulls clashed with the New Ultimates on several occasions. In the final showdown, Death Adder was murdered by the Scourge, Diamondback fled alongside Sidewinder as the Ultimates member Bombshell wanted revenge for the murder of her boyfriend Poey, and the rest of the Serpent Skulls were presumably arrested and taken into custody.

Earth-33900
In the Avengers series dedicated to the American Armed Forces, the Serpent Society attacks an airport in search of Sergeant Joe Wilton and his satchel containing a possible secret weapon. The membership consists of leader Cobra, Viper (Murtaugh), Eel, Death Adder (Scott), and Anaconda. Their plans are thwarted by the Avengers, as well as Anaconda, whose father is a former marine.

Marvel Super Hero Adventures
In this comic book series aimed towards younger readers, the Serpent Society consists of King Cobra, Anaconda, Bushmaster, Asp, Princess Python, and their new recruit Garden Snake. The group planned to steal millions of dollars in a Jersey City shipyard. They planned to use Garden Snake to shrink down so that she could unlock the cargo's lock. However, Spider-Man and Ms. Marvel discovered their plan. With the help of Garden Snake, Spider-Man and Ms. Marvel defeated the Serpent Society.

Spider-Bot Infinity Comic
The Serpent Society appears in this digital-first comic series where they battle Spider-Bot and Captain America. The team consists of Anaconda, Cottonmouth, Rattler, and Puff Adder.

In other media

Television
 The Serpent Society appears in The Avengers: Earth's Mightiest Heroes, consisting of King Cobra, Anaconda, Bushmaster, Death Adder, Rattler, Constrictor, and Viper.
 The Serpent Society appears in Marvel Disk Wars: The Avengers, consisting of King Cobra, Diamondback, Cottonmouth, and Death Adder.
 The Serpent Society appears in the Marvel Future Avengers episode "Mission Black Market Auction", consisting of Diamondback, Asp, and Black Mamba.

Film

In a press conference held on October 28, 2014 covering Phase Three of the Marvel Cinematic Universe, Marvel Studios president Kevin Feige initially announced that the sequel to Captain America: The Winter Soldier (2014) would be titled Captain America: Serpent Society as a red herring before introducing Chris Evans and Robert Downey Jr. to the stage and revealing the film's real title as Captain America: Civil War (2016).

Video games
The Serpent Society appear in the Captain America: The Winter Soldier tie-in game, consisting of King Cobra, Diamondback, and Puff Adder.

Miscellaneous
The Serpent Society appear in the novel Marvel Avengers: The Serpent Society, by Pat Shand and published by Joe Books Ltd. in 2017. This version of the group is led by Black Mamba and consists of Anaconda, Bushmaster, Asp, King Cobra, Fer-de-Lance, Puff Adder, and Copperhead.

References

External links
 
 
 
 

Marvel Comics supervillain teams
Characters created by Mark Gruenwald
Characters created by Paul Neary
Captain America